Wach is a Polish and German surname. Notable people with the surname include:

Aloys Wach (1892–1940), Austrian expressionist painter and graphic artist
Andrzej Wach, Polish administrator, President of Polskie Koleje Państwowe S.A. (Polish State Railways)
Gilles Wach (born 1956), French Roman Catholic priest
Joachim Wach (1898–1955), German scholar of religion and sociologist
Karl Wilhelm Wach (1787–1845), German painter
Mariusz Wach (born 1979), Polish boxer
Ryszard Wach (born 1946), Polish modern pentathlete

See also
Wach (disambiguation)
Wachs

References

Polish-language surnames
Surnames from given names